Vivekananda College is a men-only autonomous college of arts and sciences in Thiruvedagam in Madurai district affiliated to Madurai Kamaraj University. It was founded in 1971 by Swami chidbhavanada and is managed by Ramakrishna Tapovanam. It is the only registered Gurukula Institute of Life Training in India. The National Assessment and has given the 'A' grade (CGPA 3-59/4.00) for the college when the college was reaccredited in 2014 . It has an IGNOU study centre. The students are encouraged to join Certificate Programmes and Degree Programmes offered by IGNOU. 
 
The college has three daily prayers, compulsory physical activities like yoga and sports, and optional activities like silambam and gymnastics.

Ramakrisha Tapovanam in Tiruvedagam West also manages Vivekananda Higher Secondary School and Narendra Nursery school in the same campus and Vivekananda Matriculation School in Sholavandan

History

The institute has been autonomy since 1987.. It has been accredited  'A' Grade by NAAC since 2002.

Protecting the environment
Each student plants ten seedlings in his native place and ten seedlings in the villages around our Gurukulam. The student puts on a record card the type of seedling planted and where, and measures its growth rate for eight months.

The student who plants the most tree seedlings is given an award.

IGNOU Study Centre
Dr.M.Sendhilvelan of the Commerce Department was responsible for the establishment of the centre. Dr..V.Parthasarathy of Zoology Department is the Coordinator of the centre. All the students are encouraged to join courses offered by IGNOU. This year 161 regular students have joined the programmes offered by IGNOU.

References 

Men's universities and colleges
Education in Madurai district
Educational institutions established in 1971
1971 establishments in Tamil Nadu
Colleges in Madurai
Colleges affiliated to Madurai Kamaraj University
Universities and colleges in Madurai